A Night in Tuscany is the first DVD released by Italian singer Andrea Bocelli of a concert which took place at the Piazza dei Cavalieri in Pisa in 1997. The concert includes duets with soprano Nuccia Focile, Italian rock star Zucchero, and English soprano Sarah Brightman.

The concert was also Bocelli's first PBS Special, part of the In the Spotlight series, designed to promote his breakthrough album, Romanza. It also marked his debut to the American audience.

Programme 
 "Introduction"
 "Setting the Stage"
 "Nessun Dorma"
 "La Donna e Mobile"
 "Lamento di Federico"
 "E Luceane le Selle"
 "Interview with Andrea"
 "O Soave Fanicullia" (duet with Nuccia Focile)
 "Brindisi" (duet with Nuccia Focile)
 "Andrea and his family"
 "Torna a Surriento"
 "Santa Lucia Luntana"
 "O Sole Mio"
 "Andrea in the studio"
 "Vivo por Ella" (duet with Martha Sanchez)
 "Con Te Patiro"
 "Romanza"
 "*E Chiove"
 "Voglio Restare Cosi"
 "Caruso"
 "Il Mare Calmo Della Serra"
 "Miserere" (duet with Zucchero)
 "Time to Say Goodbye" (duet with Sarah Brightman)
 "Closing Credits"

*Arrangiamenti orchestrali del M° Paolo Raffone

Charts

Certifications

References

1998 live albums
1998 video albums
Andrea Bocelli video albums
Live video albums